Savvas Siatravanis (born 24 November 1992) is a Greek professional footballer who plays as a forward for Super League 2 club Makedonikos.

Career

AEL
Siatravanis signed for AEL in 2008. After one year playing with the team's U18 and U21 squads, he was promoted to the first team on 27 May 2009, having signed a five-year contract.

He made his debut in European competitions during a 2009–10 Europa League qualifier against KR Reykjavík from Iceland. He was the youngest Greek player to ever play in a European match, being 16 years 7 months and 22 days old.

Apollon Smyrnis
On 29 June 2016 Siatravanis signed for Football League club Apollon Smyrnis on a one-year contract. On 15 December 2016 he scored a hat-trick against Panathinaikos in the Greek Cup.The game ended 3-4 and Apollon Smyrni was eliminated from the next round. In the 2016–17 season he recorded the best stats of his career with 13 goals and 5 assists in 31 appearances. His team gained promotion to the Superleague, after winning the title. On 8 June 2017 the team's administration extended his contract for another year, acknowledging his contribution.

Kerkyra
On 25 August 2018, Kerkyra announced the signing of Siatravanis on a two-year deal. On 4 November 2018, he scored his first goal for the club in a 1–0 home win against his old club, Iraklis. On 25 November 2018, he opened the score in a 2–0 away win against Apollon Pontou. On 15 December 2018, he scored in a 1–1 home draw against Trikala.

Newcastle Jets
On the 8th of September 2021, Siatravanis signed with the Newcastle Jets for the 2021/2022 Season. Siatravanis scored his first goal for the club on the 16th of April 2022, in a 1-2 Loss to Melbourne Victory

References

External links 

1992 births
Living people
Greek footballers
Greek expatriate footballers
Super League Greece players
Football League (Greece) players
Super League Greece 2 players
A-League Men players
Athlitiki Enosi Larissa F.C. players
Iraklis Thessaloniki F.C. players
Panachaiki F.C. players
Apollon Smyrnis F.C. players
PAE Kerkyra players
Xanthi F.C. players
Niki Volos F.C. players
Newcastle Jets FC players
Apollon Larissa F.C. players
Greek expatriate sportspeople in Australia
Expatriate soccer players in Australia
Association football midfielders
Footballers from Larissa